Vlas is both a surname and a given name. Notable people with the name include:

Adrian Vlas (born 1982), Romanian footballer
Valeriu Vlas (born 1971), Moldovan long-distance runner
Vlas Chubar (1891–1939), Ukrainian Bolshevik and Soviet politician
Vlas Doroshevich (1864–1922), Russian journalist and writer

See also
Sveti Vlas, a town in Bulgaria
Vilina Vlas, a Serbian concentration camp